Isaac Harker (born October 26, 1995) is an American professional gridiron football quarterback who is currently a free agent. He was most recently a member of the BC Lions of the Canadian Football League (CFL). He played college football at Indiana State and Colorado Mines.

College career
Harker played college football for Indiana State from 2014 to 2017 and for Colorado Mines in 2018.

College statistics

Professional career

Saskatchewan Roughriders
In April 2019, Harker signed with the Saskatchewan Roughriders of the Canadian Football League (CFL). Harker made his professional debut for the Riders in the first game of the season following injuries to starting quarterback Zach Collaros and backup Cody Fajardo. In his debut Harker completed eight of 14 pass attempts for 114 yards with two interceptions.

BC Lions
On February 9, 2022, it was announced the BC Lions had signed Harker to a contract. However, he was released just prior to training camp on May 14, 2022.

Career statistics

References

External links
 Colorado Mines bio

1995 births
Living people
American players of Canadian football
American football quarterbacks
Canadian football quarterbacks
People from Lebanon, Indiana
Indiana State Sycamores football players
Colorado Mines Orediggers football players
Saskatchewan Roughriders players